NGC 2164 is a 10th-magnitude open cluster in the Dorado constellation. The celestial object was discovered on September 27, 1826, by the Scottish astronomer James Dunlop. Its apparent size is 2.5 arcmin. It is located in the Large Magellanic Cloud.

References

External links
 

Open clusters
ESO objects
2164
Large Magellanic Cloud
Dorado (constellation)
Astronomical objects discovered in 1826